The British Empire Range is a mountain range on Ellesmere Island in Nunavut, Canada. The range is one of the most northern ranges in the world and the Arctic Cordillera, surpassed only by the Challenger Mountains which lies immediately to the northwest and the United States Range slightly further east. The highest mountain in the range is Barbeau Peak.

The range was named by Gordon Noel Humphreys during the Oxford University Ellesmere Land Expedition. Edward Shackleton, also a member of the party, claimed, in 1937, that Humphreys had done so because he was "a great imperialist".

Peaks of the range include:

References

Geographical Names of the Ellesmere Island National Park Reserve and Vicinity by Geoffrey Hattersley-Smith (1998) 

 
Arctic Cordillera
Mountain ranges of Qikiqtaaluk Region